Judith Ruth Buchanan (born 1967) is a British academic specialising in Early Modern literature and film studies. Since October 2019, she has been Master of St Peter's College, Oxford.

Biography
Buchanan undertook postgraduate research in early Modern literature at the University of Oxford. She took a break from her doctorate to study film in New York, United States, as a Fulbright Scholar. She later returned to Oxford and completed her Doctor of Philosophy (DPhil) degree. He doctoral thesis was titled "Visions of the island: The Tempest on film, 1905-1991" and was submitted in 1997. 

Buchanan began her academic career as a junior research fellow at Worcester College, Oxford. Having completed her DPhil, she taught in the Faculty of English, University of Oxford, and was Wilkinson Research Fellowship at Worcester College. In 2000, she moved to the University of York as a lecturer in their Department of English. She was promoted to senior lecturer, before being appointed appointed Professor of Film and Literature in 2011 to 2019. She also served as dean of York's Faculty of Arts and Humanities from 2017 to 2019.

In May 2019, Buchanan was announced as the next Master of St Peter's College, Oxford: she took up the appointment on 1 October 2019. She is also a pro-vice-chancellor of the University of Oxford.

Buchanan is married and has two children.

Selected works
 
 
 Buchanan, Judith (ed) (2013), The Writer on Film: Screening Literary Authorship. Palgrave. .
 Film Institute DVD Play On!, with voice-over commentaries by Judith Buchanan (2016)

References

Living people
Shakespearean scholars
British literary historians
Women literary historians
British mass media scholars
British film historians
Fellows of Worcester College, Oxford
Academics of the University of York
Masters of St Peter's College, Oxford
1967 births
Fulbright alumni
Alumni of Worcester College, Oxford